The Chamberlayne Baronetcy of Wickham, Oxfordshire was created for Thomas Chamberlayne in the Baronetage of England on 4 February 1643. He was appointed High Sheriff of Oxfordshire for 1643.

Chamberlayne baronets of Wickham, Oxfordshire (1643)
 Sir Thomas Chamberlayne, 1st Baronet (died 6 October 1643)
 Revd Sir Thomas Chamberlayne, 2nd Baronet (–1682)
 Sir James Chamberlayne, 3rd Baronet (c.1640–October 1699)
 Sir James Chamberlayne, 4th Baronet (died 23 December 1767)
 Sir Henry Chamberlayne, 5th Baronet (died 25 January 1776) Baronetcy extinct on his death.

References

Extinct baronetcies in the Baronetage of England